David Griffiths (4 December 1895 – 1 June 1953) was an Australian rules footballer who played with Richmond and St Kilda in the Victorian Football League (VFL).

Notes

External links 
		

1895 births
1953 deaths
Australian rules footballers from Western Australia
Richmond Football Club players
St Kilda Football Club players
Kalgoorlie Railways Football Club players
Kalgoorlie City Football Club players
Australian rules footballers from Ballarat